Al-Ahli Jeddah is a professional basketball club based in the city of Jeddah in the Makkah Province, Saudi Arabia that plays in the Saudi Premier League.

Achievements
Kingdom League (3)
Western Region Championship (6)
First Class Cup (3)
Saudi Alnokhbah Cup (1)
Saudi Federation Cup (1)
Youth Care Cup (1)

References

External links
Team profile at Asia-Basket.com

Basketball teams established in 1938
Basketball teams in Saudi Arabia
Sport in Jeddah